Vinorine is an indole alkaloid isolated from Alstonia.

References

Alkaloids found in Apocynaceae
Tryptamine alkaloids
Quinolizidine alkaloids
Acetate esters
Heterocyclic compounds with 6 rings